Patricia Lips (born 21 December 1963) is a German politician of the Christian Democratic Union (CDU) who has been serving as a member of the Bundestag for Odenwald in the state of Hesse since 2002.

Political career 
Lips first became a member of the Bundestag in the 2002 German federal election. She served on the Finance Committee from 2004 until 2013 and later chaired the Committee for Education, Research and Technology Assessment from 2014 until 2017.

Following the 2018 elections, Lips became a member of the Budget Committee – where she was her parliamentary group's rapporteur on the annual budget of the Federal Government Commissioner for Culture and Media – and of its so-called Confidential Committee (Vertrauensgremium), which provides budgetary supervision for Germany’s three intelligence services, BND, BfV and MAD.

From March 2020 to January 2021, Lips managed the campaign of Friedrich Merz in the 2021 CDU leadership election.

Since 2021, Lips has been serving as one her parliamentary group's deputy chairs, under the leadership of chair Ralph Brinkhaus. In this capacity, she oversees the group’s legislative activities on European affairs and human rights. In addition, she has been a member of the German delegation to the Franco-German Parliamentary Assembly since 2022.

Other activities 
 Leibniz Association, Member of the Senate (since 2021)

Political positions 
In June 2017, Lips voted against Germany's introduction of same-sex marriage.

References

External links 

  
 Bundestag biography 

1963 births
Living people
Members of the Bundestag for Hesse
Female members of the Bundestag
21st-century German women politicians
Members of the Bundestag 2021–2025
Members of the Bundestag 2017–2021
Members of the Bundestag 2013–2017
Members of the Bundestag 2009–2013
Members of the Bundestag 2005–2009
Members of the Bundestag 2002–2005
Members of the Bundestag for the Christian Democratic Union of Germany
Recipients of the Cross of the Order of Merit of the Federal Republic of Germany